William J. Campbell may refer to:

 William James Campbell (1850–1896), state senator and Lieutenant Governor of Illinois
 William Joseph Campbell (1905–1988), U.S. federal judge from Illinois
 Bill Campbell (California politician) (born 1942), Republican politician from California
 William John Campbell, mayor of Freetown, Sierra Leone
 William J. Campbell (general) (1931–2017), American Air Force general
 William Joseph Campbell (meteorologist) (1930–1992),  American meteorologist

See also
William Campbell (disambiguation)